A dzo (also spelled zo, zho and dzho) is a hybrid between the yak and domestic cattle. There is also the English language portmanteau term of yattle, a combination of the words yak and cattle, as well as yakow, a combination of the words yak and cow.

Dzomo are fertile (or, fecund) while dzo are sterile. As they are a product of the hybrid genetic phenomenon of heterosis (hybrid vigor), they are larger and stronger than yak or cattle from the region. In Mongolia and Tibet, khainags are thought to be more productive than cattle or yaks in terms of both milk and meat production.

Dzomo can be back crossed. As a result, many supposedly pure yak or pure cattle probably carry each other's genetic material.

Dzo inherit two different types of proteins, one from each parent, and their mitochondrial structure and function changes. This significantly changes the dzo's ability to survive in higher altitudes than both parents can.

See also
 Bovid hybrid
 Yakalo, a yak/buffalo (American bison) hybrid

References

External links 
 
 

Bovid hybrids